HMS Prince (also referred to as Royal Prince) was a 100-gun first rate ship of the line of the Royal Navy, built by Phineas Pett the Younger at Deptford Dockyard and launched in 1670.

History

During the Third Anglo-Dutch War she served as a flagship of the Lord High Admiral the Duke of York (later James II & VII.) During the Battle of Solebay (1672) she was in the centre of the English fleet that was attacked by the Dutch centre led by Admiral Michiel de Ruyter. Prince was heavily damaged by De Ruyter's flagship De Zeven Provinciën in a two hours' duel and Captain of the Fleet Sir John Cox was killed on board. Princes second captain, John Narborough, however conducted himself with such conspicuous valour that he won special approbation and was knighted shortly afterwards.

HMS Prince was rebuilt by Robert Lee at Chatham Dockyard in 1692, and renamed at the same time as HMS Royal William. During the War of the Grand Alliance the ship saw action at the Battle of Barfleur of 19 May 1692. Prince belonged to the red squadron and carried the flag of Rear-admiral of the red Sir Cloudesley Shovell. She was the first ship to break the French line during the battle.

Later she was rebuilt for a second time by John Naish of Portsmouth but using Chatham Dockyard from 1714, relaunching on 3 September 1719. She was laid up after her re-launch and saw no service at all until she was reduced to an 84-gun Second rate ship in 1756. One year later, she was part of an unsuccessful expedition against Rochefort led by Admiral Sir Edward Hawke. Her squadron, under Vice-Admiral Charles Knowles, attacked the Île-d'Aix and forced her garrison to surrender. In 1758 she participated in Boscawen's and Wolfe's attack on the French Fortress of Louisbourg (Nova Scotia) and an indecisive skirmish with a French squadron. The following year Royal William returned to Canada under the command of Captain Hugh Pigot to join the attack on Quebec. After the Battle of the Plains of Abraham and the capture of Quebec she sailed back to England with the body of General Wolfe. In 1760 Royal William was Boscawen's flagship when he took command of the fleet in Quiberon Bay. During the expedition against Belle Île of 1761 she was detached with several other ships to cruise off Brest and prevent a French counter-attack from there.

The Seven Years' War seems to be the last time that Royal William played an active role. She was broken up in 1813.

Commanders of Note

Wittewronge Taylor 1757/8
Hugh Pigot 1759 to 1763
Samuel Hood briefly in 1771
George Gayton 1790 to 1794
Adrian Zaknich 2023 to 2099
Tim Helander 2023 to 2099

References

Bibliography

External links
 
Ship model of Royal Prince, Science and Society Picture Library, UK

Ships of the line of the Royal Navy
1670s ships